Rehmat Ali is a 2010 Indian Bengali-language film directed by Partho Ghosh for producers Raj Behl and Geeta Behl, starring Mithun Chakraborty, Rituparna Sengupta and Roopa Ganguly . It marked the return of Mithun Chakraborty to the Bengali film industry after a long gap. It is a remake of Partho's 1997 Bollywood film Ghulam-E-Mustafa which itself was remade from 1996 Tamil film Musthaffaa.

Cast 
Mithun Chakraborty
Rituparna Sengupta
Roopa Ganguly
Biswajit Chakraborty
Rajatava Dutta
Biswanath
Jayanta Dutta Burman
Sanchita Nandi

Songs
Lyrics have been written by Lipi and Bijoy Bhakat.

"Sundori Sundori" – Shaan
"Moja Dekhabo" – Bappi Lahiri
"Saiyaan Bina Ghar Suna" – Sunidhi Chauhan
"Tumi Amar Ami Tomar" – Shaan, Bappi Lahiri, Alka Yagnik
"Joy Kali Joy Kali" – Sadhana Sargam, Chinton
"Saiyaan Bina Ghar Suna (Remix)" – Madhushree

Box office
Rehmat Ali could not repeat the success of the original Tamil film and ended up as an average success at the box office.

Remakes

References

External links 
 

2010 films
2010s Bengali-language films
Bengali-language Indian films
Bengali remakes of Tamil films
Bengali remakes of Hindi films
Films scored by Bappi Lahiri
Indian gangster films
Indian action drama films
Films directed by Partho Ghosh
2010 action films